The Kingdom of Bohemia (sometimes in English literature referred to as the Czech Kingdom, was a medieval and early modern monarchy in Central Europe, the predecessor of the modern Czech Republic. It was an Imperial State in the Holy Roman Empire, and the Bohemian king was a prince-elector of the empire. The kings of Bohemia, besides the region of Bohemia proper itself, also ruled other lands belonging to the Bohemian Crown, which at various times included Moravia, Silesia, Lusatia, and parts of Saxony, Brandenburg, and Bavaria.

The kingdom was established by the Přemyslid dynasty in the 12th century from the Duchy of Bohemia, later ruled by the House of Luxembourg, the Jagiellonian dynasty, and from 1526 the House of Habsburg and its successor, the House of Habsburg-Lorraine. Numerous kings of Bohemia were also elected Holy Roman Emperors, and the capital, Prague, was the imperial seat in the late 14th century, and again at the end of the 16th and the beginning of the 17th centuries.

After the dissolution of the Holy Roman Empire in 1806, the territory became part of the Habsburg Austrian Empire, and subsequently the Austro-Hungarian Empire from 1867. Bohemia retained its name and formal status as a separate Kingdom of Bohemia until 1918, known as a crown land within the Austro-Hungarian Empire, and its capital Prague was one of the empire's leading cities. The Czech language (called the Bohemian language in English usage until the 19th century) was the main language of the Diet and the nobility until 1627 (after the Bohemian Revolt was suppressed). German was then formally made equal with Czech and eventually prevailed as the language of the Diet until the Czech National Revival in the 19th century. German was also widely used as the language of administration in many towns after the Germans immigrated and populated some areas of the country in the 13th century. The royal court used the Czech, Latin, and German languages, depending on the ruler and period.

Following the defeat of the Central Powers in World War I, both the Kingdom and Empire were dissolved. Bohemia became the core part of the newly formed Czechoslovak Republic.

History

13th century (growth)
Although some former rulers of Bohemia had enjoyed a non-hereditary royal title during the 11th and 12th centuries (Vratislaus II, Vladislaus II), the kingdom was formally established in 1198 by Přemysl Ottokar I, who had his status acknowledged by Philip of Swabia, elected King of the Romans, in return for his support against the rival Emperor Otto IV. In 1204 Ottokar's royal status was accepted by Otto IV as well as by Pope Innocent III. It was officially recognized in 1212 by the Golden Bull of Sicily issued by Emperor Frederick II, elevating the Duchy of Bohemia to Kingdom status and proclaiming its independence which was also later bolstered by future king of Bohemia and emperor Charles IV. with his golden bull in 1356.

Under these terms, the Czech king was to be exempt from all future obligations to the Holy Roman Empire except for participation in the imperial councils. The imperial prerogative to ratify each Bohemian ruler and to appoint the bishop of Prague was revoked. The king's successor was his son Wenceslaus I, from his second marriage.

Wenceslaus I's sister Agnes, later canonized, refused to marry the Holy Roman Emperor and instead devoted her life to spiritual works. Corresponding with the Pope, she established the Knights of the Cross with the Red Star in 1233, the first military order in the Kingdom of Bohemia.

The 13th century was the most dynamic period of the Přemyslid reign over Bohemia. German Emperor Frederick II's preoccupation with Mediterranean affairs and the dynastic struggles known as the Great Interregnum (1254–73) weakened imperial authority in Central Europe, thus providing opportunities for Přemyslid assertiveness. At the same time, the Mongol invasions (1220–42) absorbed the attention of Bohemia's eastern neighbors, Hungary and Poland.

Přemysl Ottokar II (1253–78) married a German princess, Margaret of Babenberg, and became duke of Austria. He thereby acquired Upper Austria, Lower Austria, and part of Styria. He conquered the rest of Styria, most of Carinthia, and parts of Carniola. He was called "the king of iron and gold" (iron because of his conquests, gold because of his wealth). He campaigned as far as Prussia, where he defeated the pagan natives and in 1256, founded a city he named Královec in Czech, which later became Königsberg (now Kaliningrad).

In 1260, Ottokar defeated Béla IV, king of Hungary in the Battle of Kressenbrunn near the Morava river, where more than 200,000 men clashed. He ruled an area from Austria to the Adriatic Sea. From 1273, however, Habsburg king Rudolf began to reassert imperial authority, checking Ottokar's power. He also had problems with rebellious nobility in Bohemia. All of Ottokar's German possessions were lost in 1276, and in 1278 he was abandoned by part of the Czech nobility and died in the Battle on the Marchfeld against Rudolf.

Ottokar was succeeded by his son King Wenceslaus II, who was crowned King of Poland in 1300. Wenceslaus II's son Wenceslaus III was crowned King of Hungary a year later. At this time, the Kings of Bohemia ruled from Hungary to the Baltic Sea.

The Germans populated towns and mining districts on the Bohemian periphery and in some cases formed German colonies in the interior of the Czech lands. Stříbro, Kutná Hora, Německý Brod (present-day Havlíčkův Brod), and Jihlava were important German settlements. The Germans brought their own code of law – the  – which formed the basis of the later commercial law of Bohemia and Moravia. Marriages between Czech nobles and Germans soon became commonplace.

14th century ("Golden Age")

The 14th century – particularly the reign of Charles IV (1342–78) – is considered the Golden Age of Czech history. In 1306, the Přemyslid line died out and, after a series of dynastic wars, John, Count of Luxembourg, was elected Bohemian king. He married Elisabeth, the daughter of Wenceslaus II. He was succeeded as king in 1346 by his son, Charles IV, the second king from the House of Luxembourg. Charles was raised at the French court and was cosmopolitan in attitude.

Charles IV strengthened the power and prestige of the Bohemian kingdom. In 1344 he elevated the bishopric of Prague, making it an archbishopric and freeing it from the jurisdiction of Mainz, and the archbishop was given the right to crown Bohemian kings. Charles curbed the Bohemian, Moravian, and Silesian nobility, and rationalized the provincial administration of Bohemia and Moravia. He created the Crown of Bohemia, incorporating Moravia, Silesia and Lusatia.

In 1355 Charles was crowned Holy Roman Emperor. The next year he issued the Golden Bull of 1356, defining and codifying the process of election to the Imperial throne, with the Bohemian king among the seven electors. Issuance of the Golden Bull together with the ensuing acquisition of the Brandenburg Electorate gave the Luxemburgs two votes in the electoral college. Charles also made Prague into an Imperial capital.

Extensive building projects undertaken by the king included the founding of the New Town southeast of the old city. The royal castle, Hradčany, was rebuilt. Of particular significance was the founding of Charles University in Prague in 1348. Charles intended to make Prague into an international center of learning, and the university was divided into Czech, Polish, Saxon, and Bavarian "nations", each with one controlling vote. Charles University, however, would become the nucleus of intense Czech particularism.

Charles died in 1378, and the Bohemian crown went to his son, Wenceslas IV. He had also been elected King of the Romans in 1376, in the first election since his father's Golden Bull. He was deposed from the Imperial throne in 1400, however, having never been crowned Emperor.  His half-brother, Sigismund, was eventually crowned Emperor in Rome in 1433, ruling until 1437, and he was the last male member of the House of Luxemburg.

15th century (Hussite movement)
The Hussite movement (1402–85) was primarily a religious, as well as national, manifestation. As a religious reform movement (the so-called Bohemian Reformation), it represented a challenge to papal authority and an assertion of national autonomy in ecclesiastical affairs. The Hussites defeated four crusades from the Holy Roman Empire, and the movement is viewed by many as a part of the (worldwide) Protestant Reformation. Because many of warriors of the crusades were Germans, although many were also Hungarians and Catholic Czechs, the Hussite movement is seen as a Czech national movement. In modern times it acquired anti-imperial and anti-German associations and has sometimes been identified as a manifestation of a long-term ethnic Czech–German conflict.

Hussitism began during the long reign of Wenceslaus IV (1378–1419), a period of papal schism and concomitant anarchy in the Holy Roman Empire. It was precipitated by a controversy at Charles University in Prague. In 1403 Jan Hus became rector of the university. A reformist preacher, Hus espoused the anti-papal and anti-hierarchical teachings of John Wycliffe of England, often referred to as the "Morning Star of the Reformation". Hus' teaching was distinguished by its rejection of what he saw as the wealth, corruption, and hierarchical tendencies of the Roman Catholic Church. He advocated the Wycliffe doctrine of clerical purity and poverty, and insisted on the laity receiving communion under both kinds, bread and wine. (The Roman Catholic Church in practice reserved the cup, or wine, for the clergy.) The more moderate followers of Hus, the Utraquists, took their name from the Latin , meaning "under each kind". The Taborites, a more radical sect, soon formed, taking their name from the town of Tábor, their stronghold in southern Bohemia. They rejected church doctrine and upheld the Bible as the sole authority in all matters of belief.

Soon after Hus assumed office, German professors of theology demanded the condemnation of Wycliffe's writings. Hus protested, receiving the support of the Czech element at the university. Having only one vote in policy decisions against three for the Germans, the Czechs were outvoted, and the orthodox position was maintained. In subsequent years, the Czechs demanded a revision of the university charter, granting more adequate representation to the native Czech faculty. The university controversy was intensified by the vacillating position of the Bohemian king Wenceslas. His favoring of Germans in appointments to councillor and other administrative positions had aroused the nationalist sentiments of the Czech nobility and rallied them to Hus' defense. The German faculties had the support of Zbyněk Zajíc, Archbishop of Prague, and the German clergy. For political reasons, Wenceslas switched his support from the Germans to Hus and allied with the reformers. On 18 January 1409, Wenceslas issued the Decree of Kutná Hora: (as was the case at other major universities in Europe) the Czechs would have three votes; the others, a single vote. In consequence, German faculty and students left Charles University en masse in the thousands, and many ended up founding the University of Leipzig.

Hus' victory was short-lived. He preached against the sale of indulgences, which lost him the support of the king, who had received a percentage of such sales. In 1412 Hus and his followers were suspended from the university and expelled from Prague. For two years the reformers served as itinerant preachers throughout Bohemia. In 1414 Hus was summoned to the Council of Constance to defend his views. Imprisoned when he arrived, he was never given a chance to defend his ideas. The council condemned him as a heretic and burned him at the stake in 1415.

Hus's death sparked the Hussite Wars, decades of religious warfare. Sigismund, the pro-papal king of Hungary and successor to the Bohemian throne after the death of Wenceslas in 1419, failed repeatedly to gain control of the kingdom despite aid by Hungarian and German armies. Riots broke out in Prague. Led by a Czech yeoman, Jan Žižka, the Taborites streamed into the capital. Religious strife pervaded the entire kingdom and was particularly intense in the German-dominated towns. Hussite Czechs and Catholic Germans turned on each other; many were massacred, and many German survivors fled or were exiled to the rest of the Holy Roman Empire. Emperor Sigismund led or instigated various crusades against Bohemia with the support of Hungarians and Bohemian Catholics.

The Hussite Wars followed a pattern. When a crusade was launched against Bohemia, moderate and radical Hussites would unite and defeat it. Once the threat was over, the Hussite armies would focus on raiding the land of Catholic sympathizers.  Many historians have painted the Hussites as religious fanatics; they fought in part for a nationalist purpose: to protect their land from a King and a Pope who did not recognize the right of the Hussites to exist. Žižka led armies to storm castles, monasteries, churches, and villages, expelling the Catholic clergy, expropriating ecclesiastical lands, or accepting conversions.

During the struggle against Sigismund, Taborite armies penetrated into areas of modern-day Slovakia as well. Czech refugees from the religious wars in Bohemia settled there, and from 1438 to 1453 a Czech noble, John Jiskra of Brandýs, controlled most of southern Slovakia from the centers of Zólyom (today Zvolen) and Kassa (today Košice). Thus Hussite doctrines and the Czech Bible were disseminated among the Slovaks, providing the basis for a future link between the Czechs and their Slovak neighbors.

When Sigismund died in 1437, the Bohemian estates elected Albert of Austria as his successor. Albert died and his son, Ladislaus the Posthumous – so called because he was born after his father's death – was acknowledged as king. During Ladislaus' minority, Bohemia was ruled by a regency composed of moderate reform nobles who were Utraquists. Internal dissension among the Czechs provided the primary challenge to the regency. A part of the Czech nobility remained Catholic and loyal to the pope. A Utraquist delegation to the Council of Basel in 1433 had negotiated a seeming reconciliation with the Catholic Church. The Compacts of Basel accepted the basic tenets of Hussitism expressed in the Four Articles of Prague: communion under both kinds; free preaching of the Gospels; expropriation of church land; and exposure and punishment of public sinners. The pope, however, rejected the compact, thus preventing the reconciliation of Czech Catholics with the Utraquists.

George of Poděbrady, later to become the "national" king of Bohemia, emerged as leader of the Utraquist regency. George installed another Utraquist, John of Rokycany, as archbishop of Prague and succeeded in uniting the more radical Taborites with the Czech Reformed Church. The Catholic party was driven out of Prague. After Ladislaus died of leukemia in 1457, the following year the Bohemian estates elected George of Poděbrady as king. Although George was noble-born, he was not a successor of royal dynasty; his election to the monarchy was not recognised by the Pope, or any other European monarchs.

George sought to establish a "Charter of a Universal Peace Union." He believed that all monarchs should work for a sustainable peace on the principle of national sovereignty of states, principles of non-interference, and solving problems and disputes before an International Tribunal. Also, Europe should unite to fight the Turks. States would have one vote each, with a leading role for France. George did not see a specific role for Papal authority.

Czech Catholic nobles joined in the League of Zelená Hora in 1465, challenging the authority of George of Poděbrady; the next year, Pope Paul II excommunicated George. The Bohemian War (1468-1478) pitted Bohemia against Matthias Corvinus and Frederick III of Habsburg, and the Hungarian forces occupied most of Moravia. George of Poděbrady died in 1471.

After 1471: Jagiellonian and Habsburg rule

Upon the death of the Hussite king, the Bohemian estates elected a Polish prince Ladislaus Jagiellon as king, who negotiated the Peace of Olomouc in 1479. In 1490, after death of Matthias Corvinus, he also elected by the strongest Hungarian baron league king of Hungary, and the Polish Jagellonian line ruled both Bohemia and Hungary [but separate line was in Poland after Casimir]. The Jagellonians governed Bohemia as absentee monarchs because Hungarian nobility insisted them to put their capital to Hungary; their influence in the kingdom was minimal, and effective government fell to the regional nobility. Czech Catholics accepted the Compact of Basel in 1485 and were reconciled with the Utraquists. The Bohemian estrangement from the Empire continued after Vladislav [as II] had succeeded Matthias Corvinus of Hungary in 1490 and both the Bohemian and the Hungarian kingdom were held in personal union. Not considered an Imperial State, the Lands of the Bohemian Crown were not part of the Imperial Circles established by the 1500 Imperial Reform.

In 1526 Vladislav's son, King Louis, was decisively defeated by the Ottoman Turks at the Battle of Mohács and subsequently died. As a result, the Turks conquered part of the Kingdom of Hungary, and the rest (mainly present-day Slovakia territory) came under Habsburg rule under the terms of King Louis' marriage contract. The Bohemian estates elected Austrian Archduke Ferdinand, younger brother of Emperor Charles V, to succeed Louis as king of Bohemia. Thus began almost four centuries of Habsburg rule for both Bohemia and Hungary.

The incorporation of Bohemia into the Habsburg monarchy against the resistance of the local Protestant nobility sparked the 1618 Defenestration of Prague and the Thirty Years' War. Their defeat at the Battle of White Mountain in 1620 put an end to the Bohemian autonomy movement.

Defeat and dissolution 

In 1740 the Prussian Army conquered Bohemian Silesia in the Silesian Wars and forced Maria Theresa in 1742 to cede the majority of Silesia, except the southernmost area with the duchies of Cieszyn, Krnov and Opava, to Prussia. In 1756 Prussian King Frederick II faced an enemy coalition led by Austria, when Maria Theresa was preparing for war with Prussia to reclaim Silesia. The Prussian army conquered Saxony and in 1757 invaded Bohemia. In the Battle of Prague (1757) they defeated the Habsburgs and subsequently occupied Prague. More than one quarter of Prague was destroyed and the St. Vitus Cathedral suffered heavy damage. In the Battle of Kolín, however, Frederick lost and had to vacate Prague and retreat from Bohemia.

With the dissolution of the Holy Roman Empire in 1806, the Bohemian kingdom was incorporated into the now two years old Austrian Empire and the royal title retained alongside the title of Austrian Emperor. In the course of the 1867 Austro-Hungarian Compromise the provinces of Bohemia, Moravia and Austrian Silesia became k. k. crown lands of Cisleithania. The Bohemian Kingdom officially ceased to exist in 1918 by transformation into the Czechoslovak Republic.

The current Czech Republic consisting of Bohemia, Moravia and Czech Silesia still uses most of the symbols of the Kingdom of Bohemia: a two-tailed lion in its coat-of-arms, red-white stripes in the state flag and the royal castle as the president's office.

Economy

Bohemia was among the first countries in Europe to become industrialized. Mining of tin and silver began in Ore mountains in early 12th century.
For the industrial development of the  Czech kingdom, German hospes [or settler or Siedler who wandered to also Poland and Hungary] from the 12th century had enormous role. In the late 12th and in the 13th century the Přemyslid rulers promoted the colonisation of certain areas of their lands by German settlers from the adjacent lands of Bavaria, Franconia, Upper Saxony and Austria during the Ostsiedlung migration. The new settlers not only brought their customs and language with them, but also new technical skills and equipment that were adapted within a few decades, especially in agriculture and crafts.
In Silesia it had doubled (16% of the total area) by the beginning of the 11th century, 30% in the 16th century and the highest increase rates in the 14th century, the total area of arable land increased seven - to twentyfold in many Silesian regions during the Ostsiedlung. They settled mostly the hills and mountains and started the mine works and high qualities industry such as metal works, weapon industry and beer making. Forest glass production was a common industry for German Bohemians.

Lands of the Bohemian Crown

Bohemia proper with the County of Kladsko was the main area of the Kingdom of Bohemia. The Egerland was ultimately obtained by King Wenceslaus II between 1291 and 1305; given in pawn to Bohemia by King Louis IV of Germany in 1322 and subsequently joined in personal union with Bohemia proper. In 1348 Charles IV created the Crown of Bohemia, together with the incorporated provinces:

 the Margraviate of Moravia, acquired by Přemyslid and Slavník Bohemian rulers after the 955 Battle of Lechfeld, lost in 999 to Poland and reconquered by Duke Bretislaus I in 1019/1029 (uncertain dating);
 Upper Lusatia, incorporated by Charles' father King John of Bohemia in 1319 (Bautzen Land) and 1329 (Görlitz), and Lower Lusatia (former March of Lusatia), acquired by Charles IV from the Wittelsbach duke Otto V of Bavaria in 1367. The Habsburg emperor Ferdinand II ceded the Lusatias to the Electorate of Saxony by the 1635 Peace of Prague;
 the Duchies of Silesia, acquired by the 1335 Treaty of Trentschin between King John of Bohemia and King Casimir III of Poland. Queen Maria Theresa lost Silesia in 1742 to the Prussian king Frederick the Great by the Treaty of Breslau, with the exception of Austrian Silesia.
 the northern part of the Upper Palatinate ("Bohemian Palatinate") at Sulzbach, incorporated into the Bohemian crown by Charles IV in 1355. Charles exchanged parts of this territory for Brandenburg in 1373, while his son Wenceslaus lost the rest in 1400 to the Electorate of the Palatinate under King Rupert of Germany;
 the Brandenburg Electorate, acquired in 1373 by Charles IV from the Wittelsbach duke Otto V of Bavaria. Charles' son Emperor Sigismund granted Brandenburg to Frederick I of Hohenzollern in 1415.

at times were incorporated into the Kingdom of Bohemia these provinces:
 the Duchy of Austria in 1251, the Duchy of Styria in 1261, the Egerland in 1266, the Duchy of Carinthia with the March of Carniola and the Windic March in 1269, and the March of Friuli in 1272, all acquired by the Přemyslid king Ottokar II of Bohemia but lost to Rudolph of Habsburg in the 1278 Battle on the Marchfeld;

The modern Czech Republic (Czechia) is the legal successor of the Crown of Bohemia, as stated in the preamble to its Constitution.

Administrative division
Kraje/Kreise of Bohemia (pre-1833)

Prior to 1833, Bohemia was divided into seven to sixteen district units. These included the following in different time periods:

Bechyně
Boleslav
Čáslav
Chrudim 
Hradec Králové
Kladsko; lost to Prussia following the First Silesian War (1740–42)
Kouřim at Prague
Litoměřice
Loket
Vltava
Plzeň
 at Beroun
Prácheňsko at Písek
Rakovník
Slaný
Žatec

Kraje/Kreise 1833–1849

According to Johann Gottfried Sommer Bohemia was divided into 16 district units between 1833 and 1849:

Beroun
Nový Bydžov
České Budějovice
Mladá Boleslav
Čáslav
Chrudim
Loket
Kouřim
Klatovy
Hradec Králové
Litoměřice
Plzeň
Prácheň; capital Písek; named after 
Rakovník, Slaný
Žatec
Tábor

Okres/Bezirke 1850–1918

After 1850, Bohemia's district units were sub-divided into 104 districts (German: , pl. ;).

 
 
 
 
 
 
 
  (after 1908;)
 
 
 
 
 
 
 
 
 
  (after 1896;)
 
  (from 1913;)
 
 
 
 
 
 
 
  (from 1910;)
 
 
 
  (from 1905;)
 
 
 
  (from 1893)
 
 
 
 
 
  (from 1884;)
 
 
 
 
 
 
 
 
 
 
  (from 1902;)
 
 
 
 
 
  (before 1899 part of the Neustadt an der Mettau district;)
 
  (from 1910;)
 
  (from 1903;)
 
 
 
 
 
 
 
 
 
  (dissolved in 1884;)
 
 Prague (statutory city;;)
  (from 1902;)
 
 
 
 
 
  (from 1896;)
 
 
 
 
 
 
 
 
 
  (district seat: Prague)
 
 
 
 
 
 
 
 
 
 
  (from 1908;)
 
  (from 1898)

Demographics

1910 census

Language distribution by district (1910)

See also

 List of Bohemian monarchs
 Crown of Saint Wenceslas
 History of the Czech lands
 Kingdom Come: Deliverance

Notes

References

Bibliography

External links

 
History of Bohemia
Bohemia
Medieval Kingdom of Bohemia
Bohemia
Boh
Bohemia
Bohemia
States and territories established in 1198
States and territories disestablished in 1918
1198 establishments in Europe
1190s establishments in the Holy Roman Empire
1918 disestablishments in Austria-Hungary
2nd millennium in Bohemia
Lands of the Bohemian Crown